Princess Louisa Marine Provincial Park is a provincial park in British Columbia, Canada surrounding Princess Louisa Inlet.

Gallery

References

External links

Provincial parks of British Columbia
Sunshine Coast Regional District
Pacific Ranges
1965 establishments in British Columbia
Protected areas established in 1965
Marine parks of Canada